The House of Ögedei, sometimes called the Ögedeids, was an influential Mongol family and a branch of the Borjigin clan from the 12th to 14th centuries. They were descended from Ögedei (c. 1186–1241), a son of Genghis Khan who succeeded his father to become the second khagan of the Mongol Empire. Ögedei continued the expansion of the Mongol Empire.

When, after the Toluid Möngke Khan's death, the Mongol Empire disintegrated into civil war, the members of the House of Ogedei were influential players in the politics of the region. From the lines of Genghis Khan's sons — Ogedei, Jochi, Chagatai, and Tolui, the House of Ögedei tended to ally with the Chagataids (descendants of Chagatai) against the House of Jochi, while seeking control for themselves within the Chagatai Khanate at first. The Ogedeids also allied with the Golden Horde against the Yuan founding emperor Kublai (son of Tolui), who was allied with his brother Hulagu, leader of the Ilkhanate in Persia. The Ogedeids attempted to unite the Mongol Empire under their own rule, and Ogedeid princes continued to march against the Yuan dynasty well into the 14th century, such as during the Kaidu–Kublai war.

A peace occurred shortly in 1304, but the war soon resumed. In 1310, Kaidu's successor Chapar Khan surrendered to the Yuan emperor Khayishan, and the territory controlled by the House of Ögedei was divided up by the Chagataids and the Yuan dynasty, after he and his relatives failed to win the Chagatai Khanate. After that, members from this family often appeared as influential contenders or puppet rulers under powerful amirs and noyans in the Northern Yuan dynasty (rump state of the Yuan dynasty) and Transoxiana in the 14th and 15th centuries. While being Turkified and vanished into Tartars.

Notable members
 Ögedei Khan (1186–1241), son of Genghis Khan, and second Khagan of the Mongol Empire
 Güyük Khan (1206–1248), son of Ögedei, and third Khagan of the Mongol Empire
 Kadan, son of Ögedei, and co-leader of the Mongol force that attacked Poland in the 13th century
 Kaidu (c. 1235 – 1301), grandson of Ögedei, leader of the House of Ögedei, and de facto khan of the Chagatai Khanate
 Khutulun (c. 1260–1306), Kaidu's daughter and warrior princess
 'Ali-Sultan, the Muslim Khan of the Chagatai Khanate (r.1342/1343)
 Danishmendji (d. 1348), khan of the Chagatai Khanate from 1346 to 1348
 Soyurghatmïsh Khan (d. 1384), khan of the Western Chagatai Khanate
 Sultan Mahmud (Chagatai) (d. 1402), khan of the Western Chagatai Khanate
 Örüg Temür Khan, khan of the Northern Yuan dynasty from 1402 to 1408
 Adai Khan, khan of the Northern Yuan dynasty from 1425 to 1438

Descendants of Ögedei

House of Güyük 
Güyük Qan(貴由/guìyóu,گيوك خان/Guyūk khān)
(忽察/hūchá,خواجه اغول/Khwaja Āghūl)
(禿苦滅/tūkǔmiè,توکمه/Tūkme)
Busju Ebügen(بوسجو ابوکانBūsjū Ābūkān)
(禿魯/tūlŭ,توقلوق/Tūqlūq)
Irgendzen(亦児監蔵/yìérjiāncáng)
Ölǰei Ebügen(完者也不干/wánzhĕyĕbùgān)
(腦忽/nǎohū,ناقو/Nāqū)
Čabat(چبات/Chabāt)
(禾忽/héhū,هوقو/Hūqū)

House of Köden 
Köden(闊端/hédān,كوتان/kūtān)
Mergidei(滅里吉歹/mièlǐjídǎi)
Yes buqa(也速不花/yěsùbúhuā,ییسوبوقا/yīsū būqā)
Möngetü(蒙哥都/mēnggēdōu,مونكاتو/mūnkātū)
Irinǰin(亦憐真/yìliánzhēn,ایرنچان/īrinchān)
(只必帖木児/zhībìtiēmùér,جینك تیمور/jīnk tīmūr)
Tebile(帖必烈/tiēbìliè,ممبوله＝تیبوله/tībūle)
Külük(曲列魯/qūlièlǔ,كورلوك/kūrlūk)
Bek temür(別帖木児/biétiēmùér)
(也速也不干/yěsùyěbúgān)
(脱脱木児/tuōtuōmùér)

House of Küčü 
(闊出/kuòchū,کوچو/Kūchū)
(昔列門/xīlièmén,شيرامون/Shīrāmūn)
Qunǰi(قونجی/Qūnjī)
Qadai(哈歹/hādǎi,قادای/Qādāī)
Aluγui(阿魯灰/ālǔhuī,القوی/Ālqūī)
Sadur(سادور/Sādūr)
Boladči(孛羅赤/bóluochì,بولاوجی/Būlāūjī)
Söse(小薛/xiǎoxuē,سوسه/Sūse)

House of Qaračar 
(哈剌察兒/hǎlácháér,قراچار/Qarāchār)
Tötaq(脱脱/tuōtuō,توظاق/Tūṭāq)

House of Qaši 

(合失/héshī,قاشی/qāshī)
Qaidu(海都/hǎidōu,قايدو/qāīdū)
(察八児/chábāér,چاپار/chāpār)
Ölǰei temür(完者帖木児/wánzhětiēmùér)
Qulatai(忽剌台/ hūlátái)
(يانگيچار/yāngīchār)
(斡羅思/wòluosī, اوروس/ūrūs)
Sarban(ساربان/sārbān)
Qutulun Čaγan(قوتولو ن جغا/qūtūlūn jaghā)

House of Qada'an 
Qada'an oγul(合丹/hédān,قدان اغور/Qadān āghūr)
Dorǰi(覩爾赤/dǔěrchì,دورجی/Dūrjī)
Söse(小薛/xiǎoxuē,سوسه/Sūse)
Singgibal    (星吉班/xīngjíbān)
Askiba(اسکبه/Askiba)
Yesür(也速児/yěsùér,ییسور/Yīsūr)
Qibčaq(قبچاق/Qibchāq)
Quril(قوریل/Qūrīl)
Ebügen(也不干/yěbúgān,ابوکانAbūkān)
Qorangsa(火郎撒/huǒlángsā)
Yesün tu'a(也孫脱/yěsūntuō)
Qoniči(火你/huǒnǐ)

House of Melik 
(滅里/mièlǐ,ملک/Melik)
Tuman(禿満/tūmǎn,تومان/Tūmān)
Küčün(曲春/qūchūn)
Temürči(帖木児赤/tiēmùérchì)
(阿魯輝帖木児/ālŭhuītiēmùér)
Qutuq Temür(忽都帖木児/hūdōutiēmùér)
Toγan Buqa(تگان بوقا/Togān Būqā)
Olqut(اولوکتو/Ūlūktū)
Toγančar(توغانچار/Tūghānchār)
Torčan(تورجان/Tūrjān)
Toqu(脱忽/tuōhū,توقو/Tūqū)
Abdullah(俺都剌/ǎndōulà,عبدالله/Abdullah)
Ayači(愛牙赤/àiyáchì)
Taiping(太平/tàipíng)

See also
 Division of the Mongol Empire
 Chagatai Khanate
 Northern Yuan dynasty

References

 

 
Mongol Empire
Former countries in Chinese history